Helen C. Epstein (born 1961) is an American professor of human rights and public health, with a special interest in Uganda and other countries in East Africa. She has conducted research on reproductive health and AIDS in Africa for such organizations as the Rockefeller Foundation, the Population Council, and Human Rights Watch, and her articles have appeared in The New York Review of Books, The New York Times Magazine, Granta Magazine, and many other publications. Her research interests include the right to health care in developing countries and the relationship between poverty and health in industrialized countries.

Biography
Epstein received her BA degree in 1984 (Physics, University of California-Berkeley), her PhD in 1991 (Molecular Biology, Cambridge University), and her MSc in 1996 (Public Health in Developing Countries, London School of Hygiene and Tropical Medicine).  In 1993, she moved to Uganda in search of an AIDS vaccine and taught molecular biology in the medical school at Makerere University in Kampala for a year.

Although Epstein's efforts to find a vaccine failed, she was able to witness firsthand the suffering caused by HIV, which became the subject of her book The Invisible Cure: Why We Are Losing The Fight Against AIDS in Africa (2007).  This autobiographical account discusses 15 years of observing both the epidemic and the reactions to it of Western scientists, humanitarian agencies, and the communities most affected by AIDS deaths.  Epstein discusses how the countries that are hardest hit by HIV are not those whose citizens are “promiscuous”, but those where it is common for people to have “long term concurrent” sexual relationships (in which an individual might have more than one long-term partner at one time) with those partners overlapping for months or years.

After the publication of her 2007 book, Epstein continued to research political and humanitarian issues in Uganda and elsewhere in East Africa. The New York Times and the New York Review of Books have featured her reporting from Africa.

Epstein has been a visiting research scholar at Princeton's Center for Health and Wellbeing, part of the Princeton School of Public and International Affairs, and from 2013-2014 was an Open Society Fellow with the Open Society Foundations. Since 2010 she has been Visiting Professor of Human Rights and Global Public Health in the Global and International Studies Program at Bard College.

Bibliography

Books
 
''Another Fine Mess: America, Uganda, and the War on Terror" (Columbia Global Reports, 2017)

Book reviews

References

External links
Helen Epstein on Africa: Writing About Rights in Africa
"There is no room for sexual morality in an honest conversation about AIDS." The Guardian. 9 Aug 2007.
A list of all her articles from The New York Review of Books
Muck Rack: Articles by Helen Epstein
"The Fidelity Fix." The New York Times. 13 June 2004.
Plagues of transition
Interview: AIDS Journalist Helen Epstein on The Invisible Cure by Philanthropy Action
AIDS in Africa: Rising Above the Partisan Babble in New York Times, Zulger, Abigail. New York Times. 3 July 2007.
Africa Slides Toward Disaster, NYTimes, 1 August, 2014

1961 births
Living people
Alumni of the University of Cambridge
People associated with HIV/AIDS
Academic staff of Makerere University
East Africa